Wide Sargasso Sea is a 1966 novel by Dominican-British author Jean Rhys. The novel serves as a postcolonial and feminist prequel to Charlotte Brontë's novel Jane Eyre (1847), describing the background to Mr. Rochester's marriage from the point-of-view of his wife Antoinette Cosway, a Creole heiress. Antoinette Cosway is Rhys's version of Brontë's devilish "madwoman in the attic". Antoinette's story is told from the time of her youth in Jamaica, to her unhappy marriage to an English gentleman, Mr. Rochester, who renames her Bertha, declares her mad, takes her to England, and isolates her from the rest of the world in his mansion. Antoinette is caught in a patriarchal society in which she fully belongs neither to Europe nor to Jamaica. Wide Sargasso Sea explores the power of relationships between men and women and discusses the themes of race, Caribbean history, and assimilation.

Rhys lived in obscurity after her previous work, Good Morning, Midnight, was published in 1939. She had published other novels between these works, but Wide Sargasso Sea caused a revival of interest in Rhys and her work and was her most commercially successful novel.

In 2022, it was included on the "Big Jubilee Read" list of 70 books by Commonwealth authors, selected to celebrate the Platinum Jubilee of Elizabeth II.

Plot
The novel, initially set in Jamaica, opens a short while after the Slavery Abolition Act 1833 abolished slavery in the British Empire on 1 August 1834. The protagonist Antoinette relates the story of her life from childhood to her arranged marriage to an English gentleman, Mr. Rochester.

The novel is in three parts:

Part One takes place in Coulibri, a sugar plantation in Jamaica, and is narrated by Antoinette as a child. Formerly wealthy, since the abolition of slavery, the estate has become derelict and her family has been plunged into poverty. Antoinette's mother, Annette, must remarry to wealthy English gentleman Mr. Mason, who is hoping to exploit his new wife's situation. Angry at the returning prosperity of the planter class, emancipated slaves living in Coulibri burn down Annette's house, killing Antoinette's mentally disabled younger brother, Pierre. As Annette had been struggling with her mental health up until this point, the grief of losing her son weakens her sanity. Mr. Mason sends her to live with a couple who torment her until she dies. When Antoinette visits her after the fire, Annette refuses to see or speak to her. Antoinette visits her mother once more when she is older but is alarmed at the abuse she witnesses by the servants to her mother and goes away without speaking to her.

Part Two alternates between the points of view of Antoinette and her husband during their honeymoon excursion to her mother's summer estate Granbois, Dominica. Likely catalysts for Antoinette's downfall are the mutual suspicions that develop between the couple, and the machinations of Daniel, who claims he is Antoinette's illegitimate half-brother; he impugns Antoinette's reputation and mental state and demands money to keep quiet. Antoinette's old nurse Christophine openly distrusts Mr. Rochester. His apparent belief in the stories about Antoinette's family and past aggravate the situation; her husband is unfaithful and emotionally abusive. He begins to call her Bertha rather than her real name and flaunts an affair in front of her to cause her pain. Antoinette's increased sense of paranoia and the bitter disappointment of her failing marriage unbalance her already precarious mental and emotional state. She flees to the house of Christophine. Antoinette pleads with Christophine for an obeah potion to attempt to reignite her husband's love, which Christophine reluctantly gives her. Antoinette returns home but the love potion acts like a poison on her husband. Subsequently he hardens his heart against reconciling with his wife and decides to take her away from Granbois out of spite.

Part Three is the shortest part of the novel; it is from the perspective of Antoinette, renamed by her husband as Bertha. Mr. Rochester's father and brother have died, so he has returned to England with Antoinette to claim his sizeable inheritance. She is largely confined to "the attic" of Thornfield Hall, the mansion she calls the "Great House". The story traces her relationship with Grace Poole, the servant who is tasked with guarding her, as well as her disintegrating life with Mr. Rochester, as he hides her from the world. He promises to come to her more but never does. Antoinette is thought mad by those who interact with her and has little understanding of how much time she has been confined. She dreams of freedom, when she remembers, and writes to her stepbrother Richard in Jamaica who, however, says he cannot not "interfere legally" with her husband. Desperate and enraged, she attacks him with a knife bought in secret. She later forgets this encounter. Expressing her thoughts in stream of consciousness, Antoinette dreams of flames engulfing the house and her freedom from the life she has there, and believes it is her destiny to fulfill the vision. Waking from her dream she escapes her room, and sets out candle in hand.

Themes

Postcolonialism
Since the late 20th century, critics have considered Wide Sargasso Sea as a postcolonial response to Jane Eyre. Rhys uses multiple voices (Antoinette's, her husband's, and Grace Poole's) to tell the story, and intertwines her novel's plot with that of Jane Eyre. In addition, Rhys makes a postcolonial argument when she ties Antoinette's husband's eventual rejection of Antoinette to her Creole heritage (a rejection shown to be critical to Antoinette's descent into madness). The novel is also considered a feminist work, as it deals with unequal power between men and women, particularly in marriage.

Slavery and ethnicity
Antoinette and her family were planters who owned slaves until the passage of the Slavery Abolition Act, which resulted in the family losing their wealth. They are pejoratively called "white nigger" or "white cockroach" by the island's Black inhabitants because of their poverty and are openly despised, harassed, and assaulted. The villagers, inadvertently or not, kill Antoinette's brother, setting fire to the home and seem poised to murder the rest of the family if not for the apparition of an ill omen - their dying green parrot. Meanwhile, Rochester looks down on Antoinette because of her status as a Creole. Scholar Lee Erwin describes this paradox through the scene in which Antoinette's childhood home Coulibri is burned down and she runs to Tia, a black girl her own age, to "be like her". Tia attacks Antoinette, throwing a rock at her head. Antoinette then says she sees Tia "as if I saw myself. Like in a looking glass". Erwin argues that "even as she claims to be seeing "herself," she is simultaneously seeing "the other", that which only defines the self by its separation from it, in this case literally by means of a cut. History here, in the person of a former slave's daughter, is figured as refusing Antoinette", the daughter of a slave owner.

In the novel, Rhys also explores the legacy of slavery and the slave trade, focusing on how abolition dramatically affected the status of Antoinette's family as planters in colonial Jamaica. Scholar Trevor Hope has noted that the "triumphant conflagration of Thornfield Hall in Wide Sargasso Sea may at one level mark a vengeful attack upon the earlier textual structure". The destruction of Thornfield Hall occurs in both novels; however, Rhys epitomises the fire as a liberating experience for Antoinette. Hope has suggested that the novel "[takes] residence inside the textual domicile of empire in order to bring about its disintegration or even, indeed, its conflagration".

Publication and reception
Rhys' editor Diana Athill discusses the events surrounding the publication of the book in her memoir. The book came out of a friendship between Rhys and Selma Vaz Dias who encouraged her to start writing again. At the time, Rhys was living in a shack made of corrugated iron and tar paper in a slum neighbourhood of Cheriton Fitzpaine. The book was virtually completed in November 1964 when Rhys, who was 74 years old and complained of the cold and rain in her shack, suffered a heart attack. Athill cared for Rhys in the hospital for two years, keeping a promise not to publish the book until Rhys was well enough to compile the manuscript and add a few final lines. The income from the book provided enough money for Rhys to improve her living conditions.

On 5 November 2019, BBC News listed Wide Sargasso Sea on its list of the 100 most influential novels.

Awards and nominations
Winner of the WH Smith Literary Award in 1967, which brought Rhys to public attention after decades of obscurity.
Named by Time as one of the '100 best English-language novels since 1923'.
Rated number 94 on the list of Modern Library's 100 Best Novels
Winner of Cheltenham Booker Prize 2006 for year 1966

Adaptations
1993: Wide Sargasso Sea, film adaptation directed by John Duigan and starring Karina Lombard and Nathaniel Parker.
1997: Wide Sargasso Sea, a chamber opera adaptation with music by Australian composer Brian Howard, directed by Douglas Horton.
2004: Wide Sargasso Sea, BBC Radio 4 10-part adaptation by Margaret Busby, read by Adjoa Andoh (repeated 2012, 2014, 2019). 
2006: Wide Sargasso Sea, TV movie adaptation directed by Brendan Maher and starring Rebecca Hall and Rafe Spall.
2011: "Wide Sargasso Sea", song written by rock 'n' roll singer Stevie Nicks about the novel and film; it appears on her 2011 album In Your Dreams.
2016: BBC Radio Four dramatization (one hour) by Rebecca Lenkiewicz (repeated 2020).

See also
Sargasso Sea

References

External links
 "Wide Sargasso Sea, Bertha and Jane Eyre", The Magpie Poet blog
 Wide Sargasso Sea, study guide, themes, quotes, & teacher resources
 Review JaneEyre.net

1966 British novels
Metafictional novels
Novels by Jean Rhys
Parallel literature
British novels adapted into films
Novels set in Jamaica
Novels set in Dominica
Postcolonial novels
Postmodern novels
Prequel novels
Works based on Jane Eyre
André Deutsch books